The 2019–20 California Golden Bears men's basketball team represented the University of California, Berkeley in the 2019–20 NCAA Division I men's basketball season. This was Mark Fox's first year as head coach at California. The Golden Bears played their home games at Haas Pavilion as members of the Pac-12 Conference. They finished the season 14–18, 7–11 in Pac-12 play to finish in a three-way tie for eighth place. They defeated Stanford in the first round of the Pac-12 tournament and were set to take on UCLA in the quarterfinals before the remainder of the Pac-12 Tournament was cancelled amid the COVID-19 pandemic.

Previous season
The Golden Bears finished the 2018–19 season with a record of 8–23, 3–15 in Pac-12 play to finish in last place. They lost in the first round of the Pac-12 tournament to Colorado.

On March 24, Wyking Jones was fired. He finished with a 2-year record of 16–47 overall and 5–31 in the Pac-12. Former Georgia and Nevada head coach Fox was hired on March 29.

Off-season

Departures

Incoming transfers

2019 recruiting class

2020 recruiting class

Roster

Schedule and results

|-
!colspan=9 style=| Exhibition

|-
!colspan=9 style=| Non-conference regular season

|-
!colspan=9 style=|  Pac-12 regular season

|-
!colspan=9 style=| Pac-12 tournament

|- style="background:#bbbbbb"
| style="text-align:center"|March 12, 20206:00 pm, P12N
| style="text-align:center"| (10)
| vs. (2) UCLAQuarterfinals
| colspan=5 rowspan=1 style="text-align:center"|Cancelled due to the COVID-19 pandemic
| style="text-align:center"|T-Mobile ArenaParadise, NV
|-

References

California Golden Bears men's basketball seasons
California
California Golden
California Golden